Dream is an outdoor 2001 public artwork by Roberto Salas, installed along San Diego's Martin Luther King Jr. Promenade, in the U.S. state of California. The work, which includes five bronze hand sculptures, is one of several commemorating Martin Luther King Jr. along the promenade, including Melv Edwards' Breaking of the Chains and Shedding the Cloak by Jerry and Tama Dumlao and Mary Lynn Dominguez.

See also

 2001 in art

References

External links
 

2001 establishments in California
2001 sculptures
Bronze sculptures in California
Memorials to Martin Luther King Jr.
Monuments and memorials in California
Outdoor sculptures in San Diego